Eric Garcia may refer to:
Eric Garcia (writer) (born 1972), American writer
Eric García (footballer, born 1993), Spanish football midfielder
Eric Garcia (basketball) (born 1994), American basketball player
Eric García (footballer, born 2001), Spanish football defender

See also
Érica García (born 1968), Argentine singer